The CAF Champions League, known for sponsorship purposes as the TotalEnergies CAF Champions League and formerly the African Cup of Champions Clubs, is an annual football club competition organized by the Confederation of African Football and contested by top-division African clubs, deciding the competition winners through a round robin group stage to qualify for a double-legged knockout stage, and then a single leg final. It is one of the most prestigious football tournaments in the world and the most prestigious club competition in African football.

The winner of the tournament earns a berth for the FIFA Club World Cup, a tournament contested between the champion clubs from all six continental confederations, and also faces the winner of the CAF Confederation Cup in the following season's CAF Super Cup. Clubs that finish as runners-up their national leagues, having not qualified for the Champions League, are eligible for the second-tier CAF Confederation Cup.

Egyptian clubs have the highest number of victories (16 titles), followed by Morocco with 7. Cameroon, Egypt, Algeria, Tunisia and Morocco have the largest number of winning teams, with three clubs from each having won the title. The competition has been won by 26 clubs, 12 of which have won it more than once. Al Ahly is the most successful club in the competition's history, having won the tournament a record 10 times.

History

1964–1997: Beginnings to competition rise in prominence
Established in 1964 as the African Cup of Champions Clubs, the first team to lift the trophy was Cameroonian team Oryx Douala who beat Stade Malien of Mali 2–1 in a one-off final.

There was no tournament held the following year, but the action resumed again two years later in 1966, when the two-legged 'home and away' final was introduced, which saw another Malian team AS Real Bamako take on Stade d'Abidjan of Ivory Coast. Bamako won the home leg 3–1 but it all came apart for them in the away game in Abidjan as the Ivorians went on to win 4–1 to take the title 5–4 on aggregate.

In 1967 when Asante Kotoko of Ghana met TP Mazembe of the Democratic Republic of the Congo (or the DRC for short), both matches ended in draws (1–1 and 2–2 respectively). CAF arranged a play-off, but Kotoko failed to appear and the title was handed to Mazembe, who went on to win the title again the following year.

However, the Ghanaians got their revenge in 1970, when Kotoko and Mazembe once again met in the final. Once again, the first game ended 1–1, but against expectation, the Ghanaians ran out 2–1 winners in their away game to lift the title that had eluded them three years earlier.

The 1970s saw a remarkable rise in the fortunes of Cameroonian club football, which created the platform of success enjoyed by Cameroonian football at international level today.

Between 1971 and 1980 Cameroonian teams won the cup four times, with Canon Yaoundé taking three titles (1971, 1978 and 1980) and US Douala lifting the cup in 1979. In between the Cameroonian victories the honor was shared with another team enjoying a golden age, Guinean side Hafia Conakry, who won it three times during this period (1972, 1975 and 1977).

1997–present: Change of name and rise in reputation

Apart from the introduction of the away goals rule, very little changed in this competition until 1997, when CAF under Issa Hayatou took the bold step to follow the lead established a few years earlier by UEFA by creating a league/group stage in the tournament and changing the name to the CAF Champions League (in line with UEFA's own Champions League). CAF also introduced prize money for participants for the first time with the initial offering of US$1 million to the winners and US$750,000 to the runners-up, making the rebranded competition the richest African club competition at the time.

In the new format, the league champions of the respective CAF member countries go through a series of qualification rounds until a round of 16 stage. The 8 winners are then drawn into two groups of 4 teams each, with each team playing each other on a home and away basis. At the end of the league stage, the top team in each group met in the final, in two-legged games (home and away).

In the 2001 season, the CAF introduced the semi-finals after group stage, then the top two teams in each group met in the semi-finals, with the winners going through to contest the final. 

Beginning with the 2009 season, the prize money increased to $1.5 million for the champions and $1 million for the runner-ups. Since the competition rebranded in 1997, teams from North Africa have come to dominate the competition and its records entirely. Morocco's Raja CA won two of the first three editions, but Al Ahly became the most successful team, winning the tournaments in 2001, 2005, 2006, 2008 and 2012, while Zamalek managed to be champions in 2002. Tunisian teams broke into the championship with the title of Étoile du Sahel, which in 2007 was proclaimed champion after being finalist in 2004 and 2005. For its part, Espérance de Tunis achieved its second continental title in 2011 after having lost in the final in the 1999, 2000, 2010 and 2012 editions. 

Despite the clear dominance of North African teams, in 2003 and 2004, Nigerian team Enyimba won their first two championship titles. ASEC Mimosas from Ivory Coast and Accra Hearts of Oak from Ghana added two championships for black Africa. In 2010, TP Mazembe from the DRC became the first club to repeat as champions on two occasions, with the first pair of wins arriving in 1967 and 1968, before repeating the feat again in 2009 and 2010. In 2017, the group phase was expanded from 2 groups of 4 teams to 4 groups of 16, with the addition of an extra knock-out round.

The 2020–21 season was played behind closed doors due to the COVID-19 pandemic in Africa inline with global football leagues and competitions. Nevertheless, Al Ahly faced bitter rivals Zamalek in an-all Egyptian final (the first time two clubs from the same country compete in any final in CAF competition history), with the former emerging victorious and winning its ninth title. Al Ahly successfully defended their title for a record-extending 10th time the following season by beating Kaizer Chiefs of South Africa, but were unable to secure a 3rd consecutive title in a row and 11th title in 2022 as they were defeated 2–0 by Moroccan club Wydad Casablanca who instead captured their 3rd CAF Champions League title.

With the impending introduction of the Africa Super League in the 2023–24 season, CAF plans to keep the Champions League, but wants to potentially eliminate the group phase and have the competition exclusively made up of two-legged knockout matchups, as per the original format in 1964 to 1996.

Structure and qualification

Qualification 
The CAF Champions League is open to the winners of all CAF-affiliated national leagues, as well as the title holders from the previous season. From the 2004 season onward, with the merging of the CAF Cup and the African Cup Winners' Cup to create the second-tier CAF Confederation Cup, the runners-up of football leagues of the 12 highest-ranked countries also enter the tournament, making up a total of 64 in-competition teams. The 12 countries would be ranked based on the performance of their clubs in the previous 5 seasons/editions of the competition (the plain definition of the CAF 5-Year Ranking).

The number of teams that each association enters into the CAF Champions League is determined annually through criteria as set by the CAF Competitions Committee. The higher an association's ranking as determined by the criteria, the more teams represent the association in the Champions League, and the fewer qualification rounds the association's teams must compete in.

The CAF Champions League operates primarily as a knockout competition, with trim-down qualification rounds, a group stage, a two-legged knockout stage and a one-off final. At the start of the competition, the 64 qualified teams enter 2 qualification rounds: the preliminary stage and the first round. After the first qualifying round, the remaining teams are split into four groups of 4, whereas the teams each first-round winner vanquished transfer to the second qualification round of the Confederation Cup for hopes of group stage progression. The winners and runners-up of each group progress to the two-legged knockout stage]] for hopes of progression to a one-off final for a chance to lift the trophy for their member association.

Sponsorship 
In October 2004, MTN contracted a four-year deal to sponsor CAF's competitions worth US$12.5 million, which at that time was the biggest sponsorship deal in African sporting history.

In 2008, CAF put a value of €100 million for a comprehensive and long-term package of its competitions when it opened tenders for a new sponsor, which was scooped up by French telecommunications giant Orange through the signing of an eight-year deal the following year in July, whose terms were not disclosed.

On 21 July 2016, French oil and gas giant, Total S.A., secured an eight-year sponsorship package from CAF to support its competitions, including its main competition, the Africa Cup of Nations. In 2021, Total rebranded as TotalEnergies, although it remained as the competitions' title sponsors.

Current Sponsors:

Prizes

Trophy and medals 

Each year, the winning team is presented with the African Champion Clubs' Cup, the current version of which has been awarded since the competition name change in 1997. Forty gold medals are presented to the competition winners and 40 silver medals to the runners-up.

1997–2008 
In 1997, CAF introduced prize money for the eight participants in group stage for the first time in an African football club competition. This first trunch lasted until 2008.

2009–2016
Between 2009 and 2016, CAF increased prize money to be shared between the Top 8 clubs as follows:

2017–2022 
From 2017 to 2022, CAF increased prize money to be shared between the Top 16  clubs as follows:

* Note: National Associations receive an additional equivalent share of 5% for each amount awarded to clubs.

Broadcast coverage
Below are the current broadcast rights holders of this competition:

Records and statistics

Performance by clubs

Performance by nations

Performances by region

All-time table (Top 25 Clubs) 
 As of 5th January 2023. All matches including qualifying were taken into account with a game decided by penalties counted as draw. No awarded/withdrawn games were counted.
* Number in parentheses show number of participations.

Top goalscorers

All-time top scorers

See also

CAF Women's Champions League
CAF Confederation Cup
CAF Super Cup
African Cup Winners' Cup
CAF Cup

References

External links

List of Past and Present Winners at RSSSF

 
Confederation of African Football club competitions
Multi-national professional sports leagues